The following television stations operate on virtual channel 49 in the United States:

 K07EJ-D in Townsend, Montana
 K07JG-D in Glasgow, Montana
 K08QJ-D in Rio Grande City, Texas
 K10JK-D in Hinsdale, Montana
 K12XA-D in Abilene, Texas
 K12XJ-D in Modesto, California
 K17OK-D in Snowmass Village, Colorado
 K18EL-D in Newberg/Tigard, Oregon
 K19MI-D in Salem, Oregon
 K20DD-D in Albany, etc., Oregon
 K20EH-D in Hood River, Oregon
 K22KC-D in The Dalles, Oregon
 K23DB-D in La Grande, Oregon
 K27NZ-D in Longview, Washington
 K29LW-D in Rockaway Beach, Oregon
 K29MK-D in Deming, New Mexico
 K33OP-D in Helena, Montana
 K36CX-D in Boulder, Montana
 K49CF-D in Fort Peck, Montana
 K49LJ-D in Casper, Wyoming
 K49LK-D in North Platte, Nebraska
 KIFR in Visalia, California
 KMQV-LD in Rochester, Minnesota
 KMYA-DT in Camden, Arkansas
 KMYA-LD in Sheridan, Arkansas
 KPDS-LD in Wolcott, Indiana
 KPDX in Vancouver, Washington
 KPJO-LD in Pittsburg, Kansas
 KPXB-TV in Conroe, Texas
 KRBK in Osage Beach, Missouri
 KRLB-LD in Richland, etc., Washington
 KSAO-LD in Sacramento, California
 KSTR-DT in Irving, Texas
 KTKA-TV in Topeka, Kansas
 KTWM-LD in Lawton, Oklahoma
 KUBN-LD in Madras, Oregon
 KZAK-LD in Boise, Idaho
 W19DP-D in La Crosse, Wisconsin
 WAAA-LD in Valparaiso, Indiana
 WAQP in Saginaw, Michigan
 WBLZ-LD in Syracuse, New York
 WBPI-CD in Augusta, Georgia
 WCIX in Springfield, Illinois
 WDKA in Paducah, Kentucky
 WDNN-CD in Dalton, Georgia
 WEAO in Akron, Ohio
 WEDW in Bridgeport, Connecticut
 WEPH in Tupelo, Mississippi
 WGBD-LD in Green Bay, Wisconsin
 WIPB in Muncie, Indiana
 WJJN-LD in Dothan, Alabama
 WKIZ-LD in Key West, Florida
 WLHY-LD in Lebanon-Harrisburg-York-Lancaster, Pennsylvania
 WLYH in Red Lion, Pennsylvania
 WMLW-TV in Racine, Wisconsin
 WNYO-TV in Buffalo, New York
 WODP-LD in Fort Wayne, Indiana
 WONO-CD in Syracuse, etc., New York
 WPXL-TV in New Orleans, Louisiana
 WPXV-TV in Norfolk, Virginia
 WQDH-LD in Wilmington, North Carolina
 WQEO-LD in Memphis, Tennessee
 WRET-TV in Spartanburg, South Carolina
 WRMD-CD in Tampa, Florida
 WRXY-TV in Tice, Florida
 WTLH in Bainbridge, Georgia
 WUEO-LD in Macon, Georgia
 WVCC-LD in Westmoreland, New Hampshire
 WWTD-LD in Washington, D.C.

The following stations, which are no longer licensed, formerly operated on virtual channel 49:
 K29MU-D in Coos Bay, Oregon
 W50EQ-D in Lumberton, North Carolina
 WTBL-CD in Lenoir, North Carolina

References

49 virtual TV stations in the United States